The 2013 Six-red World Championship (often styled the 2013 SangSom 6-red World Championship for sponsorship and marketing purposes) was a six-red snooker tournament held between 2 and 7 September 2013 at the Montien Riverside Hotel in Bangkok, Thailand.

Mark Davis defended his title, which he won in 2012, by defeating Neil Robertson 8–4 in the final.

Prize money
The breakdown of prize money for this year is shown below:
 Winner: 2,000,000 baht
 Runner-up: 800,000 baht
 Semi-finalists: 400,000 baht
 Quarter-finalists: 200,000 baht
 Last 16: 100,000 baht
 Last 32: 50,000 baht
 Total: 6,000,000  baht

Round-robin stage
The top four players from each group qualified for the knock-out stage. All matches were best of 9 frames.

Group A

 Gary Wilson 5–1 Chaouki Yousfi
 Dominic Dale 5–2 Cao Yupeng
 Mark Davis 5–3 Issara Kachaiwong
 Cao Yupeng 0–5 Gary Wilson
 Mark Davis 2–5 Dominic Dale
 Cao Yupeng 5–4 Issara Kachaiwong
 Mark Davis 5–3 Cao Yupeng
 Dominic Dale 5–2 Gary Wilson
 Mark Davis 5–3 Chaouki Yousfi
 Dominic Dale 4–5 Issara Kachaiwong
 Cao Yupeng 5–4 Chaouki Yousfi
 Gary Wilson 5–4 Issara Kachaiwong
 Dominic Dale 5–1 Chaouki Yousfi
 Mark Davis 4–5 Gary Wilson
 Chaouki Yousfi 1–5 Issara Kachaiwong

Group B

 Adrian Ridley 4–5 Ahmed Galal
 Mark Selby 5–1 Noppon Saengkham
 Andrew Higginson 5–3 Kristján Helgason
 Mark Selby 4–5 Andrew Higginson
 Kristján Helgason 4–5 Adrian Ridley
 Ahmed Galal 0–5 Noppon Saengkham
 Kristján Helgason 5–0 Ahmed Galal
 Adrian Ridley 2–5 Noppon Saengkham
 Andrew Higginson 5–1 Ahmed Galal
 Mark Selby 5–1 Adrian Ridley
 Kristján Helgason 3–5 Noppon Saengkham
 Andrew Higginson 5–1 Adrian Ridley
 Mark Selby 5–2 Kristján Helgason
 Mark Selby 5–1 Ahmed Galal
 Andrew Higginson 5–0 Noppon Saengkham

Group C

 Jimmy White 1–5 Dechawat Poomjaeng
 Joe Perry 5–4 Amir Sarkhosh
 Neil Robertson 5–4 Darren Morgan
 Darren Morgan 4–5 Dechawat Poomjaeng
 Jimmy White 5–0 Amir Sarkhosh
 Neil Robertson 5–1 Joe Perry
 Darren Morgan 2–5 Amir Sarkhosh
 Joe Perry 4–5 Dechawat Poomjaeng
 Neil Robertson 5–0 Jimmy White
 Joe Perry 5–1 Darren Morgan
 Neil Robertson 5–2 Dechawat Poomjaeng
 Amir Sarkhosh 4–5 Dechawat Poomjaeng
 Joe Perry 2–5 Jimmy White
 Neil Robertson 5–1 Amir Sarkhosh
 Jimmy White 3–5 Darren Morgan

Group D

 Robert Murphy 1–5 Laxman Rawat
 Hossein Vafaei 5–4 Passakorn Suwannawat
 Robert Milkins 5–0 Laxman Rawat
 Robert Murphy 5–2 Hossein Vafaei
 Judd Trump 4–5 Robert Milkins
 Robert Murphy 5–2 Passakorn Suwannawat
 Robert Milkins 5–3 Hossein Vafaei
 Judd Trump 5–2 Laxman Rawat
 Robert Milkins 5–1 Passakorn Suwannawat
 Judd Trump 5–1 Hossein Vafaei
 Laxman Rawat 5–2 Passakorn Suwannawat
 Judd Trump 5–3 Robert Murphy
 Hossein Vafaei 5–3 Laxman Rawat
 Judd Trump 5–3 Passakorn Suwannawat
 Robert Milkins 5–3 Robert Murphy

Group E

 Robin Hull 5–3 Omar Al Kojah
 Vinnie Calabrese 1–5 Thepchaiya Un-Nooh
 Mark Williams 5–1 Omar Al Kojah
 Shaun Murphy 4–5 Vinnie Calabrese
 Vinnie Calabrese 5–4 Omar Al Kojah
 Mark Williams 5–2 Robin Hull
 Shaun Murphy 5–0 Thepchaiya Un-Nooh
 Robin Hull 5–2 Vinnie Calabrese
 Shaun Murphy 5–4 Mark Williams
 Omar Al Kojah 2–5 Thepchaiya Un-Nooh
 Robin Hull 5–4 Thepchaiya Un-Nooh
 Mark Williams 5–0 Vinnie Calabrese
 Shaun Murphy 5–1 Omar Al Kojah
 Mark Williams 5–3 Thepchaiya Un-Nooh
 Shaun Murphy 5–2 Robin Hull

Group F

 Matthew Stevens 5–1 Ken Doherty
 Alex Borg 5–3 Muhammad Majid Ali
 Stephen Maguire 5–4 Matthew Stevens
 Ken Doherty 5–4 Alex Borg
 Stephen Maguire 5–4 Ratchayothin Yotharuck
 Ken Doherty 5–2 Ratchayothin Yotharuck
 Matthew Stevens 5–3 Alex Borg
 Ken Doherty 5–1 Muhammad Majid Ali
 Matthew Stevens 5–1 Ratchayothin Yotharuck
 Stephen Maguire 5–0 Muhammad Majid Ali
 Stephen Maguire 0–5 Ken Doherty
 Alex Borg 1–5 Ratchayothin Yotharuck
 Matthew Stevens 5–2 Muhammad Majid Ali
 Stephen Maguire 5–0 Alex Borg
 Muhammad Majid Ali 3–5 Ratchayothin Yotharuck

Group G

 John Whitty 5–4 Thanawat Thirapongpaiboon
 John Higgins 5–0 Mohammad Rais Senzahi
 John Whitty 5–3 Mohamed Al-Joker
 John Higgins 5–1 Thanawat Thirapongpaiboon
 Stuart Bingham 5–1 Mohamed Al-Joker
 John Higgins 5–0 John Whitty
 Mohammad Rais Senzahi 5–3 Mohamed Al-Joker
 Stuart Bingham 3–5 John Higgins
 John Whitty 4–5 Mohammad Rais Senzahi
 Stuart Bingham 5–4 Thanawat Thirapongpaiboon
 Stuart Bingham 5–0 John Whitty
 Mohammad Rais Senzahi 2–5 Thanawat Thirapongpaiboon
 John Higgins 5–3 Mohamed Al-Joker
 Stuart Bingham 5–2 Mohammad Rais Senzahi
 Mohamed Al-Joker 5–3 Thanawat Thirapongpaiboon

Group H

 Steve Davis 5–1 Andrew Pagett
 Muhammad Asif 4–5 James Wattana
 Ricky Walden 0–5 Barry Hawkins
 Ricky Walden 5–2 Muhammad Asif
 Steve Davis 1–5 James Wattana
 Barry Hawkins 5–2 Muhammad Asif
 Ricky Walden 4–5 Steve Davis
 Barry Hawkins 3–5 James Wattana
 Ricky Walden 5–2 Andrew Pagett
 Muhammad Asif 4–5 Andrew Pagett
 Barry Hawkins 2–5 Steve Davis
 Andrew Pagett 5–1 James Wattana
 Steve Davis 2–5 Muhammad Asif
 Ricky Walden 5–0 James Wattana
 Barry Hawkins 1–5 Andrew Pagett

Knockout stage

References

External links
 

2013
2013 in Thai sport
2013 in snooker